Gonocephalus megalepis, Bleeker's forest dragon, is a species of agamid lizard. It is found in Indonesia.

References

Gonocephalus
Reptiles of Indonesia
Reptiles described in 1860
Taxa named by Pieter Bleeker
Fauna of Sumatra